The 2007 National Football League was the Gaelic football league, contested by 32 GAA counties football teams, 31 from Ireland (as Kilkenny don't compete) and London from England.

Due to the extended reshuffling of the structure for the 2008 campaign, survival in Divisions 1A and 1B, was much more precarious—with four relegation places in these divisions, the bottom two teams were relegated to Division 3, and the teams finishing in 5th place and 6th places were relegated to Division 2.

Donegal won the 2007 National Football League by securing the Division One title, a historic achievement and their first National Football League title. They were unbeaten throughout the competition.

Meath won the Division Two title.

The Dublin vs. Tyrone match was the first Gaelic football match held in Croke Park under floodlights.

Format

Division One
The top two teams from both division one A and B go on to qualify for the league semi finals and then the winning team goes on to qualify for the final. The winner of the final game are the football league champions. The bottom two teams in Division one A and B are relegated to Division three of the next format for 2008. The teams who finish in fifth and sixth place in Division A and B are relegated to Division two in the new 2008 format. The teams in first, second, third and fourth position in both Division A and B qualify to play in the new 2008 format in Division One.

Division two
The top two teams from Division two A and B go on to qualify for the division two semi finals. The winners of the semi final go on to play in the Division two finals and the winner becomes the 2007 Division two champions. The top two teams in Division 2A and 2B go on to play in Division 2 in the 2008 format. The teams that finish in third and fourth position go on to play in Division 3 of the 2008 format and the bottom four teams will play in Division four of the 2008 format.

Scoring Difference
All of the final positions in the league will be determined by each team's scoring, there will be no playoffs in the 2007 National Football League. If two teams finish the league on the same points, the scores are then taken into consideration and the team with the best average go to the higher position. If the teams remain equal after the scores have been averaged out, the result of the game which involved the two teams will be seen as the deciding factor between the teams.

Division One

Division 1A Table

Division 1B Table

Semi-finals

Final

Division two

Division 2A

Yellow - Qualified for Division Two semi-finals
White - relegated to Division Three
Red - relegated to Division Four

Round One

Round Two

Round Three

The result was declared null by the GAA; both points were awarded to Longford

Round Four

Division 2B

Yellow - Qualified for Division Two semi-finals
White - relegated to Division Three
Red - relegated to Division Four

Round One

Round Two

Round Three

Round Four

Semi-finals

Division One
Both played on Sunday, April 15, at Croke Park, Dublin
Donegal v Kildare
Mayo v Galway

Division Two

Semi-finals
Monaghan 0-11 Meath 3-09
Roscommon 2-13 v Cavan 0-14

Final 
Roscommon 0-10 Meath 2-12

Final

References

External links
 
 "Brian McIver not forgotten by Donegal for pointing out light", 27 Jun 2015

National Football League
National Football League (Ireland) seasons